Grady Easton (born September 26, 2002) is an American soccer player who plays as a defender for North Texas SC as a member of the FC Dallas youth academy.

Career

North Texas
Easton made his league debut for the club on July 25, 2020, playing the entirety of a 2–1 home victory over Forward Madison.

References

External links
Grady Easton at US Soccer Development Academy

2002 births
Living people
North Texas SC players
USL League One players
American soccer players
Soccer players from Texas
Association football defenders
People from The Woodlands, Texas